Anisophyllum may refer to one of two plant genera in the family Euphorbiaceae:

 Croton (Boivin ex Baill.)
 Euphorbia (Haw.)